The FIS Ski Flying World Ski Championships 1983 took place at Čerťák in Harrachov, Czechoslovakia on 1 January 1983.

Individual

Medal table

References

FIS Ski Flying World Championships
1983 in ski jumping
1983 in Czechoslovak sport
Sport in Harrachov
Ski jumping competitions in Czechoslovakia
January 1983 sports events in Europe